This article displays the qualifying draw of the 2011 Open de Nice Côte d'Azur.

Players

Seeds

Qualifiers

Lucky losers
  Robin Haase
  Michael Russell

Qualifying draw

First qualifier

Second qualifier

Third qualifier

Fourth qualifier

References
 Qualifying draw

Open de Nice Cote d'Azur - qualifying